NKVD screening and filtration camps, originally known as NKVD special-purpose camps / NKVD special camps, were camps for the screening of the Soviet soldiers returned from enemy occupied territories, enemy imprisonment, or enemy encirclement. There was concern among Soviet leaders that citizens that had been outside the supervision of the government and security services may need screening to ensure their political loyalty.

By the end of World War II they handled screening of all people from the Soviet territories occupied by Nazi Germany. The NKVD special-purpose camps were established by NKVD Order No. 001735 of December 28, 1941, titled "О создании специальных лагерей для бывших военнослужащих Красной Армии, находившихся в плену и в окружении противника" ("On the establishment of special camps for former soldiers of the Red Army who were in captivity, or were surrounded by the enemy").  By NKVD Order No. 00100 of February 20, 1945, they were renamed to "проверочно-фильтрационные лагеря" ("verification and filtration camps"). Surviving POWs (about 1.5 million), repatriated Ostarbeiter, and other displaced persons totaling more than 4,000,000 people were sent to special NKVD filtration camps (distinct from the Gulags).

By 1946:
 80% civilians and 20% of PoWs were freed
 5% of civilians, and 43% of PoWs, were re-drafted
 10% of civilians and 22% of PoWs were sent to labor battalions
 2% of civilians, and 15% of the PoWs, 
(226,127 out of 1,539,475 total) were transferred to the NKVD (effectively, to the Gulag).

See also
NKVD special camps in Germany 1945–1950
Filtration camp system in Chechnya

References

Soviet prisoners of war
NKVD special camps
Eastern Front (World War II)